Operation Bayonet was a multinational law enforcement operation culminating in 2017 targeting the AlphaBay and Hansa darknet markets. Many other darknet markets were also shut down.

References

2017 in law
Law enforcement operations
Informal economy
 Cybercrime
Underground culture
Tor (anonymity network)